Statistics of Swiss Super League in the 1982–83 season.

Overview
It was contested by 16 teams, and Grasshopper Club Zürich won the championship.

The Swiss top level league was contested by sixteen teams, including 14 clubs from the previous season and the two sides promoted from the second level 1981–82 Nationalliga B, FC Winterthur and FC Wettingen. The league was contested in a double round robin format, with each club playing every other club twice, for a total of 30 rounds. Two points were awarded for wins and one point for draws.

League standings

Results

Sources
 Switzerland 1982–83 at RSSSF

Swiss Football League seasons
Swiss
1982–83 in Swiss football